Scopula forbesi is a moth of the family Geometridae first described by Herbert Druce in 1884. It is found in Cameroon and Nigeria.

References

Moths described in 1884
forbesi
Insects of Cameroon
Insects of West Africa
Moths of Africa